Adel El Hadi (born 18 January 1980) is an Algerian former football player.

National team statistics

Honours
 Top scorer of the Algerian league in 2003/2004 with 17 goals for USM Annaba
 Top scorer of the Algerian second division in 2006/2007 with 19 goals for USM Annaba
 Has 5 caps for the Algerian National Team

References

External links

1980 births
Living people
Algerian footballers
Algeria international footballers
Algerian Ligue Professionnelle 1 players
Algerian Ligue 2 players
Algeria under-23 international footballers
CA Batna players
CA Bordj Bou Arréridj players
CR Belouizdad players
ES Sétif players
JSM Béjaïa players
People from Biskra
USM Annaba players
US Biskra players
Competitors at the 2001 Mediterranean Games
Association football forwards
Mediterranean Games competitors for Algeria
21st-century Algerian people